The Healy Guest House (nicknamed the Cocoon House) is a small guest cottage located in Siesta Key, Florida, originally built for Mr. and Mrs. W. R. Healy.  It was designed in 1948 by Paul Rudolph and Ralph Twitchell during their five-year partnership that sparked a modern architecture movement in Florida; the Sarasota School of Architecture. Its radical shape, featuring an inverted catenary roof, was an experiment in structure and technology. It is considered one of the most significant architectural works of the twentieth-century.

Concept
The Healys were Ralph Twitchell's in-laws. Twitchell secured a small patch of land along Bayou Louise on which to build the project. Paul Rudolph produced a series of simplified initial concept drawings for a single-story, two-bedroom, open plan rectangle with a platform floor lifted above grade and with a porch section cantilevered over the adjacent lagoon. With no interior load-bearing walls, the suspended catenary roof would be supported by tensioned steel straps fastened along the base of the structure.

The roof, itself, would be constructed of flexible ceiling panels sprayed with saran-vinyl compounds developed by the military during World War II. The compounds had been originally developed to coat U.S. Navy ships when they were being mothballed for storage. Rudolph learned that this process was known as ‘cocooning’ when he was supervising ship construction at the Brooklyn Navy Yard during the war. Thus emerged the nickname of the cottage ... ‘’Cocoon House’’.

The longitudinal walls on both sides would be entirely constructed of a series of wooden jalousie blinds that could be closed for privacy and protection, or opened for a near-360 degree view. The end walls would be made exclusively of glass. Rudolph's elegant plan of virtual transparency was designed to facilitate a complete sensory experience, encompassing the sights, sounds, and even smells of the site, but its avant-garde design would prove a challenge to build.

Construction
In addition to being an architect, Twitchell was an experienced builder. He was familiar with the materials required construction of modern structures, such as poured concrete, steel beams, metal straps, tensioning rods, and guy wires. He was one of few people in 1950 to be able to translate Rudolph's plans into reality.

The project was literally built from the ground up. A concrete seawall and platform were fabricated, on which an out-rigger beam frame was built. Jalousie walls were fabricated onsite with vertical beam framing and topped with large roof rail beams. These unsupported wall sections required significant bracing, since the end walls would be non-structural glass panels. When window contractors approached Rudolph regarding the structural continuity of frameless glazing, the architect dismissively retorted "The glass will stiffen it up."

The construction of the roof was a multi-step process. Steel support bars were fastened to footings, wrapped over the outriggers and to the roof beams. Strapping was welded along the roof beams and loosely hung, spanning the width of the house. These straps provided the naturally-curved ‘frame’ on which construction flexible insulation panels were placed. Alternating layers of spray-vinyl polymer and flexible panels gradually formed a structural roof. A slate blue colored polymer was used for the interior ceiling of the house.

Consensus
Even before it was built, the ‘’Cocoon House’’ created a sensation. The American Institute of Architects named the unbuilt work as its ‘’Best House Design of the Year’’ in 1949. Upon completion, feature articles appeared in Architectural Forum (June 1951), Interiors (June 1951), House Beautiful (July 1952), and Florida Architect (April 1958).

Among architectural scholars, the radical design of the Cocoon House is ranked among the greatest modern works of the period. In 1953, the Metropolitan Museum of Art published an assessment of American modern architecture in a volume entitled Built in USA: Post-War Architecture. Forty-three buildings (nineteen of which were houses) were represented as "the most significant examples of modern architecture built in this country since 1945". The Cocoon House is included in that collection, alongside the Philip Johnson Glass House, Charles Eames Eames House, Mies van der Rohe Farnsworth House, and Frank Lloyd Wright Jacobs House.

The U.S. Library of Congress designated the Healy Guest House as an "American Treasure". It was designated as a historic property by the City of Sarasota in 1985.

Despite being the first building to give national recognition to architect Paul Rudolph, he considered the project a failure, "It was okay on the outside, but the interior was not successful. The apparent instability of the sagging ceiling and the thrusting space upward to the perimeter, inviting you to leave – this violated the essential nature of an intimate, domestic space. The Healy Cottage taught me that the physiological nature of a space in every building was really more important than the form of the structure."

The building fell into severe disrepair in the 1980s. The roof failed. At the turn of the millennium, there was a resurgence in interest in the landmark and a major conservation effort restored the house to its original condition.

Photos: The Cocoon House under construction

References

Bibliography

External links
Cocoon House - Sarasota Architectural Foundation (Video)
Cocoon House – Society of Architectural Historians
Cocoon House – Paul Rudolph (UMass Dartmouth)
Cocoon House Elevation Drawings – Paul Rudolph (UMass Dartmouth)
Cocoon House – Gator Preservation
Rudolph Lives On – SRQ Magazine
Cocoon House – City of Sarasota
Healy Guest House – Wikiarquitectura
Cocoon House Tours – Sarasota Architectural Foundation
The Paul Rudolph Heritage Foundation - an organization founded to preserve and protect Paul Rudolph's work, to educate the public about the legacy of his philosophy, and to provide a gathering space for discussion of modern architecture

Paul Rudolph buildings
Houses completed in 1951
Houses in Sarasota County, Florida